Megan Marie Ward (born September 24, 1969) is an American actress. She is best known for her numerous credits in science fiction and horror movies and television series. In 2007, she joined the cast of the American daytime drama General Hospital as Kate Howard. She also appeared in the 1990s comedies Encino Man, Freaked, PCU, The Brady Bunch Movie, and Joe's Apartment.

Early life
Ward, born on September 24, 1969, in Los Angeles, California, is the youngest of four siblings, and her parents were both professional actors and acting coaches. When Ward was four years old, her family moved to Honolulu, Hawaii. At the age of nine, she began doing commercials for local department stores. In her early teens, she went to Japan for modeling jobs and stayed for several years. Having previously learned to speak the language from her schooling in Hawaii, she landed a job hosting a Japanese television show, Science Q, a science TV program broadcast in NHK from 1988 to February 1989.

Career
After graduating from Kaiser High School, Ward moved to Los Angeles to pursue an acting career, and secured roles in science-fiction and comedy movies (including leading roles in Charles Band's classics Crash and Burn, Trancers II and Trancers III (as Jack Deth's future-wife), Arcade, and the 1993 Tom Stern/Alex Winter horror/comedy Freaked). She is also well known for playing Robyn Sweeney, the teen crush of Dave (played by Sean Astin), in the 1992 comedy Encino Man.

In the mid-1990s, Ward had a recurring role on the show Party of Five. Following the exit of her Party of Five character, Ward took the lead role in the Cold War UFO thriller-series Dark Skies. Since the cancellation of Dark Skies, she was appearing in mainly direct-to-video films such as Tick Tock and Mirror Man as well as TV series such as Summerland, Sports Night, Kevin Hill, and Boomtown, in which she had a substantial part.

She later debuted as Kate Howard on General Hospital on May 4, 2007. Ward was taken off contract in March 2009 and remained on the series as a recurring character. In 2010, Ward was dropped completely from the cast of General Hospital. She made a special guest appearance on the show in 2018. Ward has also made a guest appearance on CSI: NY.

Most recently, Ward portrayed Michelle in the horror-thriller film The Invited under the direction of Ryan McKinney.

Personal life
In 1995, Ward married Michael Shore, whom she met in acting class. They have two children, a son named Oliver (born in 2001) and a daughter named Audrey (born in 2006).

Filmography

Film

Television

References

External links
 

1969 births
Living people
American television actresses
American film actresses
Actresses from Hawaii
People from Honolulu
American soap opera actresses
20th-century American actresses
21st-century American actresses
Actresses from Los Angeles